David Pearson (born 1942) is a British-born Canadian scientist, academic and television personality. He is a professor of earth sciences and science communication at Laurentian University in Sudbury, Ontario.

Education
Pearson was educated at the University of Durham, where he took a B.Sc. degree in geology in 1963, then at Imperial College, London, graduating Ph.D. and D.I.C. in 1967.

Career
Joining the teaching staff of Laurentian University in 1969, Pearson was the founding director of Science North, the city's interactive science museum, from 1980 to 1986. He retained an advisory position with Science North after 1986, and returned as science director in 2007 following the departure of Alan Nursall from the institution. He now serves as Senior Science Advisor to Science North and as Laurentian University's co-director of its Science Communication program.

Pearson also hosted science-oriented television programming, including TVOntario's Understanding the Earth and MCTV's syndicated The World Around Us, in the 1980s. He received the Ward Neale Medal from the Geological Association of Canada for promotion of the earth sciences in 2001, and the McNeil Medal for science communication from the Royal Society of Canada in 2003.

Pearson was the co-chair of the 2009 Ontario Expert Panel on Climate Change Adaptation.

Honours
In 2016, he was made a member of the Order of Ontario.

References

1942 births
Living people
Canadian geologists
Academic staff of Laurentian University
Canadian television hosts
People from Greater Sudbury
Members of the Order of Ontario
20th-century Canadian scientists
21st-century Canadian scientists
Scientists from Ontario
20th-century British scientists
21st-century British scientists
British geologists
Alumni of Imperial College London
Science communicators
Alumni of King's College, Newcastle